Kenia Kristel Rangel Villareal (born 6 August 1995) is a Panamanian footballer who plays as a midfielder for Costa Rican club Liga Deportiva Alajuelense and the Panama women's national team.

International career
Rangel appeared in five matches for Panama and scored one goal at the 2018 CONCACAF Women's Championship. She scored a hat trick against El Salvador in a 2018 CONCACAF Women's Championship qualification match.

See also
 List of Panama women's international footballers

References

1995 births
Living people
Sportspeople from Panama City
Panamanian women's footballers
Women's association football midfielders
Maccabi Holon F.C. (women) players
L.D. Alajuelense footballers
Ligat Nashim players
Panama women's international footballers
Panamanian expatriate women's footballers
Panamanian expatriate sportspeople in Israel
Expatriate women's footballers in Israel
Panamanian expatriate sportspeople in Costa Rica
Expatriate women's footballers in Costa Rica